Denis Silva may refer to:

 Denis Silva (footballer, born 1985), Brazilian football centre-back
 Denis Silva (footballer, born 1986), Brazilian football defender
 Denis Silva (football coach), Spanish football manager